Ardenner express is a newspaper published in Luxembourg.

The director of the newspaper, which is printed by Groupe Saint-Paul Luxembourg, is Sully Prud'homme.

Luxembourgish-language newspapers
Newspapers published in Luxembourg